Shannon Durig is an American actress, singer, and dancer best known for portraying Tracy Turnblad in the Broadway musical Hairspray, where she played over 1000 performances.

She is from Overland Park, Kansas, and went to Saint Thomas Aquinas High School. She took dance and vocal lessons at Miller Marley School of Dance and Voice in Overland Park. She auditioned nine times before she became the understudy for Tracy, then got the part a year later. Her original vocal coach was Constance Ramos, who has starred in the HGTV show Color Correction.

References

External links

Living people
Year of birth missing (living people)